Muhammad Ali Haitham (7 March 1940 – 10 July 1993) was the 2nd Prime Minister of the People's Democratic Republic of Yemen.

Haitham was appointed Prime Minister of the People's Democratic Republic of Yemen (South Yemen) in 1969. Salim Rubai Ali and the left wing of National Liberation Front (of which both Rubai and Haitham were members) took power in the country on June 22 of that year. Haitham was replaced with Ali Nasir Mohammed after he resigned from his post and left the country in August 1971.

He then formed the United Yemen Front (a political movement against the socialist regime in South Yemen) and lived in exile until the unification of the two Yemens in 1990. He played an important role in helping Yemen to have its first parliamentary elections in April 1993. Haitham was appointed as minister of social and labor affairs in May 1993.

On July 10, 1993 he died, but the circumstances of his death are still a source of debate today.

1940 births
1993 deaths
Prime Ministers of South Yemen
20th-century Yemeni politicians